The Free European Song Contest is an international song competition, organised by the German television network ProSieben and the production company Brainpool TV, with participants representing primarily European countries. The contest is similar in format to the long-running Eurovision Song Contest: each participating country submits an original song to be performed on live television, then casts votes for the other countries' songs to determine the winner.

The overall winner of the contest is the entry that has received the most points after the scores from every country have been collected and totalled.

History 
As the Eurovision Song Contest 2020 could not take place due to the outbreak of the coronavirus disease 2019 (COVID-19) in Europe, German TV station ProSieben and German entertainer Stefan Raab decided to organise Free European Song Contest as an alternative. After the success of the first edition, ProSieben has decided to plan the event also for 2021.

The first contest was held in the city of Cologne, Germany, on 16 May 2020. Sixteen countries participated: each participating country submitted an entry. The contest was won by Nico Santos, representing Spain, with the song "Like I Love You".

Participation

The following countries have all participated in the Eurovision Song Contest, or are eligible to compete by the standards of the Free European Song Contest, but have not had either public or private broadcasters indicate interest in participating (as of yet):

Competition history

Medal table

The table below shows the top-three placings from each contest, along with the years that a country won the contest.

Presenters

See also
 Bundesvision Song Contest, previous contest organised by ProSieben and held annually between the 16 states of Germany.
 Eurovision Song Contest

Notes

References

External links

 
 
 Production website at Brainpool TV

2020s German television series
2020 German television series debuts
German-language television shows
ProSieben original programming
Song contests
German music television series
Pop music festivals
2020 establishments in Europe